The 2020 Wofford Terriers football team represented Wofford College in the 2020–21 NCAA Division I FCS football season. They were led by third-year head coach Josh Conklin and played their home games at Gibbs Stadium as a member of the Southern Conference (SoCon).

On April 5, 2021, Wofford announced that it was opting out of the remainder of the spring 2021 season as a result of injuries and player opt-outs due to COVID-19.

Previous season

The Terriers finished the 2019 season 8–3, 7–1 in SoCon play to finish as SoCon champions. They received the automatic bid to the FCS Playoffs, where they lost in the first round to Kennesaw State.

Schedule
Wofford had games scheduled against South Carolina and South Carolina State, which were canceled due to the COVID-19 pandemic.

Wofford's games against East Tennessee State (postponed, but originally scheduled for March 6), Western Carolina (April 10), and Furman (April 17) were canceled when Wofford opted out of the remainder of the spring season.

Game summaries

Mercer

References

Wofford
Wofford Terriers football seasons
Wofford Terriers football